Isaac Zion Dogboe (born 26 September 1994) is a Ghanaian-British professional boxer who held the WBO junior-featherweight title in 2018.

Background
Dogboe was born in Accra, Ghana, but moved to London, England.

Amateur career
Dogboe won the 2013 Amateur Boxing Association British lightweight title, when boxing out of the Territorial Army London BC.

He qualified for the 2012 Olympics by winning a silver medal at the African Olympic Qualifying Event, beating Mohamed Bedir (EGY), Emilian Polino (TAN), Ayabonga Sonjica (RSA) and only losing on countback after a 6:6 draw in the final to Aboubakr Lbida (MAR).

In the first round of the 2012 Olympics he faced Satoshi Shimizu of Japan. Ahead on points in the first two rounds (4:3, 3:2) he lost the bout after the judges scored round three 5:2 in favour of Shimizu, overturning Dogboe's lead. The verdict was met with vocal displeasure from ringside spectators and was later described as "contentious" and a "mystery decision" by media outlets.

Professional career
After turning professional in 2013, he compiled a record of 17–0 before challenging Cesar Juarez for the vacant WBO interim junior-featherweight title, winning via fifth-round stoppage. In his next fight Dogboe would face and beat Jessie Magdaleno to capture the full WBO junior-featherweight title.

He successfully defending his WBO title with a first-round knockout against Hidenori Otake on 25 August 2018 at the Gila River Arena in Glendale, US. Dogboe knocked the ageing Otake down twice before referee Patrick Morley stepped in to prevent Otake from taking further punishment.

He lost his WBO title to Emanuel Navarrete at the Hulu Theater in New York City's Madison Square Garden on 8 December 2018. All three judges scored the fight in Navarrete's favor. On 11 May 2019, the pair fought a rematch, and Dogboe lost once again, this time by twelfth-round technical knockout.

Break from boxing 
He confirmed after his second bout with Navarrete that he would be taking a break from the sport. This would make it possible for him to continue to study for his bachelor's degree, which he had to defer due to the demanding nature of his career as a boxer.

Return 
On 5 September 2019, it was announced that Dogboe would be facing Carl Frampton in his featherweight debut. However, the fight did not come to fruition.

He is promoted by Bob Arum's Top Rank. He made a comeback against Mexican American Chris Avalos in July 2020,after stopping him in the final round of their featherweight bout at the MGM Grand. In June 2021, he defeated Adam Lopez in a featherweight bout in Las Vegas with two out of the three judges scoring the fight in his favor. That was the first time he fought with Barry Hunter as his trainer. In November 2021, he defeated Christopher Diaz on the undercard of the Terrence Crawford and Shawn Porter bout in Las Vegas.

Professional boxing record

See also
List of super-bantamweight boxing champions

References

External links

 AIBA record
2012 Olympics Athlete profile
Isaac Dogboe - Profile, News Archive & Current Rankings at Box.Live

1994 births
Living people
Boxers from Accra
Boxers at the 2012 Summer Olympics
Olympic boxers of Ghana
Ghanaian male boxers
Super-bantamweight boxers
Featherweight boxers
World super-bantamweight boxing champions
World Boxing Organization champions